, also known by his Chinese style name , was a prince of Ryukyu Kingdom.

Chatan was the fourth son of King Shō Shitsu, and his mother was Mafee Aji. Chatan was the first head of a royal family called Ufumura Udun.

Chatan was given Chatan magiri (modern Chatan, Kadena and a part of Okinawa) as his hereditary fief. Later, he served as sessei from 1689 to 1705. He was allowed to sit in litter crossing Kōfuku Gate and Ueki Gate in Shuri Castle.

Chatan Chōai died without heir in 1719. Chatan Chōki, who was the second son of King Shō Eki, became his adopted son and inherited his title.

The name "Prince Chatan" appeared in an Okinawan folktale: . In this folktale, Prince Chatan was good at playing go, he killed , a Vajrayana Buddhist monk, and was cursed, all his sons died young. The prototype of "Prince Chatan" is unclear. Some scholars considered him to be Chatan Chōai, others consider Chatan Chōki, the adopted son of Chōai, to be the basis for the story.

References

|-

1650 births
1719 deaths
Princes of Ryūkyū
Sessei
People of the Ryukyu Kingdom
Ryukyuan people
17th-century Ryukyuan people
18th-century Ryukyuan people